|}

The Hopeful Stakes is a Listed flat horse race in Great Britain open to horses aged three years or older. It is run on the July Course at Newmarket over a distance of 6 furlongs (1,207 metres), and it is scheduled to take place each year in August.

Winners since 1988

See also
 Horse racing in Great Britain
 List of British flat horse races

References
 Paris-Turf:
, 
Racing Post

Flat races in Great Britain
Newmarket Racecourse
Open sprint category horse races